Fulvio Palmieri (1903–1966) was an Italian screenwriter. He wrote approximately fifty films, including the 1961 adventure film The Corsican Brothers.

Selected filmography
 Bad Subject (1933)
 Cavalry (1936)
 Luciano Serra, Pilot (1938)
 Lost in the Dark (1947)
 Immigrants (1948)
 Baron Carlo Mazza (1948)
 Be Seeing You, Father (1948)
 Buried Alive (1949)
 Sicilian Uprising (1949)
 The Flame That Will Not Die (1949)
 Flying Squadron (1949)
 The Cliff of Sin (1950)
 The Fighting Men (1950)
 Cavalcade of Heroes (1950)
 Song of Spring (1951)
 What Price Innocence? (1952)
 Past Lovers (1953)
 The Corsican Brothers (1961)
 Highest Pressure (1965)

References

Bibliography 
 Mustazza, Leonard. The Literary Filmography: Preface, A-L. McFarland, 2006.

External links 
 

1903 births
1966 deaths
20th-century Italian screenwriters
Italian male screenwriters
Writers from Rome
20th-century Italian male writers